Sanaa Gamil, born Thoraya Youssef Atallah (April 27, 1930 – December 22, 2002), was an Egyptian actress.

Born to a Coptic Orthodox family in Minya Governorate, she moved to Cairo to pursue her acting career and changed her name to Sanaa Gamil.

One of her most notable roles was Nefisah in front of Omar Sharif in the movie Bidaya wa nihaya (A Beginning and an End) directed by Salah Abouseif in 1960. The movie was based on a novel with the same name by the Nobel Prize winner Naguib Mahfouz. Sanaa Gamil won the best supporting actress award at the Moscow Film Festival in 1961 for her role in this movie.

She had four of her films voted for by critics and featured among "the 100 best ever made Egyptian films in the 20th century" list back in 1996.

Not only a movie actress, but more importantly one of the best Egyptian theater actresses. She has also played a number of roles on the French Stage for the Comédie-Française.

She was married to the famous Egyptian journalist Louis Greiss and had no children.

She also acted in a number of TV series such as Ta'er EL Bahr (Sea Bird) with Salah Zulfikar in 1972 and Oyoun (Eyes) with Fouad el-Mohandes in 1980, and in a number of plays such as The Visit (El-Zeyara) with Gamil Ratib. In 2016 the Egyptian director Rogina Bassaly روجينا بسالي, made a documentary film about her, It's "Sana's Tale" "حكاية سناء".https://elcinema.com/work/2060718/

Filmography 

Edhak el soura tetlaa helwa (1998)
Dame du Caire, La (1992)
... aka The Woman from Cairo (International: English title: informal literal title) 
Hekmatak ya rab (1976) .... Om Naima
Zawja al-thaniya, al- (1967) .... Wife
... aka The Second Wife 
Fagr Yom gedid (1964)
... aka Dawn of a New Day 
Bidaya wa nihaya (1960)
... aka Dead Among the Living 
... aka The Beginning and the End 
Abid el mal (1953)
... aka Slaves of Money (International: English title) 
Ana bint min? (1953)
... aka Whose Daughter Am I? (International: English title)

Partial filmography
Bidaya wa nihaya
Edhak el Sora Tetlaa Helwa
Sawaq El Hanem
Hekmatak ya rab
Elzouga Elthaneya

See also
List of Copts
List of Egyptians
Bidaya wa Nihaya (film)

References

External links

Bidaya wa nihaya on IMDB
https://elcinema.com/work/2060718/
Sanaa Gamil at ElCinema

1930 births
2002 deaths
Egyptian film actresses
Egyptian comedians
Egyptian people of Coptic descent
Coptic Orthodox Christians from Egypt
Egyptian television actresses
Egyptian stage actresses
20th-century comedians